The Savoia Excelsior Palace is a 4 star hotel in Trieste, Italy owned by the Starhotels group. The hotel is located close to Piazza Unità d'Italia overlooking the Gulf of Trieste and has 142 rooms (including suites and apartments). The hotel has a bar, "Le Rive", and a restaurant, "The Savoy", which seats up to 150 people. The hotel's conference centre has 9 meeting rooms which can seat up to 650 people in total. The hotel was used as a venue for part of the 2009 G8 summit meeting.

History
The Savoia Excelsior Palace was built in 1911 by the Austrian architect Ladislaus Fiedler with classical sculptures and columns decorating the façade. At the time of its opening in 1912 the hotel was one of the most imposing and luxurious hotels in the Austro-Hungarian Empire. Throughout its history the hotel has hosted aristocrats, artists and diplomats, as well as tourists visiting Trieste on their grand tour. Emperor Franz Josef was a frequent guest and his private apartment is preserved intact. The hotel reopened in June 2009 after two and a half years of renovation.

External links
 Official website

References

Hotel buildings completed in 1911
Hotels in Trieste
1911 establishments in Austria-Hungary